Community Hospital North is a hospital in the Castleton neighborhood of Indianapolis, Indiana, U.S. It is part of the Community Health Network group of hospitals.

History
What is now Community Hospital North originally opened in 1985 as a satellite facility of Community Hospital of Indianapolis, which was subsequently renamed Community Hospital East.

See also
List of hospitals in Indianapolis

References

Hospital buildings completed in 1985
Teaching hospitals in Indiana
Healthcare in Indianapolis